Bardon Mill is a small village in Northumberland, within the vicinity of the ancient Hadrian's Wall.

Nearby landmarks include Allen Banks & Staward Gorge, Sycamore Gap, The Sill: National Landscape Discovery Centre and Vindolanda Roman Fort.

Amenities
The local pub in Bardon Mill is The Bowes Hotel. Church services alternate weekly between St. Cuthbert's Church at Beltingham and the Church of All Hallows at Henshaw, both of which are very close to the village. There is a very active Women's Institute.

A leek club show is held every year, the produce from which is auctioned along with donations the day after the show. Funds are then donated to local charities.

Every October, there is the Bardon Mill and Roman Empire conkers championships, which is held on the village green. Local community projects are asked to run a stall at the event to raise funds for their own or community projects.

Demography 
The data below shows that 49.3% of the population in Bardon Mill (Parish) are male, and 50.7% are female, which is similar to the national average  and the average within the county of Northumberland .

A total of 1.8% of the population were from a black, Asian and minority ethnic (BAME) group in Bardon Mill (Parish). This figure is lower than that of the average in Northumberland , as well as being significantly lower than the national average .

Data from the Office for National Statistics found that the average life expectancy in the Haydon and Hadrian electoral ward is 81.9 years for men, and 85.4 years for women. These statistics compare very favourably, when compared to the average life expectancy in the North East of England, of 77.4 and 81.4 years, for men and women respectively.

Car ownership is very high in Bardon Mill (Parish), with a total of 95.3% households having access to at least one car. This is significantly higher than the average within Northumberland , as well as the national average .

Economy

The only commercial pottery in the United Kingdom currently licensed to produce salt glaze pottery is Errington Reay & Co., which was established in the village in 1878.

Education 
Henshaw Church of England First School is located in the neighbouring village of Henshaw, providing education for students aged between 4 and 11 years old. The nearby Haltwhistle Academy provides education for students aged between 3 and 11 years old.

In terms of secondary education, Haydon Bridge High School provides secondary education for students aged between 11 and 16 years old, as well as post-16 study.

Folklore
A nearby farm is reputed to be haunted by the ghost of a robber, who was murdered there in the 14th century. The last alleged sighting was in 1933.

Governance
Haydon and Hadrian is a local council ward in the county of Northumberland.

, the Haydon and Hadrian ward is served by Liberal Democrats councillor, Alan Sharp.

The village is located within the parliamentary constituency of Hexham, and is served by Conservative Party Member of Parliament (MP), Guy Opperman.

The village is also in two civil parishes, divided by the Chainley Burn. The west of the village is in Henshaw parish, while the eastern portion is in Bardon Mill parish, which also extends a long way south of the River South Tyne, as well as north of the village.

Landmarks

A little over a mile to the south-west of the village is Willimoteswick Manor, a 16th-century fortified manor house, largely rebuilt in 1900. Just over a mile east of Bardon Mill is Ridley Hall and Allen Banks.

Ridley Hall was the ancestral home of a branch of the Bowes-Lyons, the late Queen Mother's family. Weddings and other functions are often held there including a Burns Night Ceilidh which is organised by the local church. The churches for the area are in Beltingham and Henshaw.

Allen Banks, which was formerly the estate belonging to the hall, were donated to the National Trust and includes 500 acres of riverbank and woodland walks, affording some of the best views in the area.

Northumberland National Park is located within a couple of miles of Bardon Mill. The northern end of the North Pennines is just a mile or so from here.

It is a world-renowned site and the location of the finding of the Vindolanda tablets – the oldest 'postcards' in the world. Some of these are to be found in the museum at Vindolanda along with a great many Roman finds from the days of the emperor Hadrian.

Notable residents
Lilian Bowes-Lyon (1895–1949), was born and grew up at Ridley Hall, near Bardon Mill. She wrote many poems about Northumberland, including Allendale Dog and Northumbrian Farm. She was a cousin of Queen Elizabeth, the Queen Mother.

Transport

Air 

Bus 
The village is served by Arriva North East and Stagecoach Cumbria & North Lancashire's 685 bus service, which provides one bus per hour linking Carlisle, Brampton and Haltwhistle with Hexham, Corbridge and Newcastle.

Rail 
The village is served by Bardon Mill station, which serves the Tyne Valley Line. Northern Trains provide 11 trains per day to Carlisle, and 13 trains per day to Hexham and Newcastle.

Road 

See also 
 Haltwhistle
 Henshaw
 Melkridge

References

External links

 

Villages in Northumberland
Civil parishes in Northumberland